Feels Like Rain is an album by Buddy Guy, released in 1993 through Silvertone Records. The title track was written by John Hiatt and also appears on his album Slow Turning, released in 1988.

Most of the album was produced by John Porter, with the exception of "I Could Cry", produced by Dave McNair and R.S. Field.

Awards
The album earned Guy the Grammy Award for Best Contemporary Blues Album.

Track listing

Charts

Personnel

Musicians

 Buddy Guy – guitar, vocals
Guest artists:
 John Mayall – piano, co-lead vocal (8)
 Bonnie Raitt – slide guitar, vocals (3)
 Paul Rodgers – co-lead vocal (5)
 Travis Tritt – co-lead vocal (7)
Other musicians:
 Tony Braunagel – percussion (tr. 3, 10)
 Tom Canning – Hammond organ (tr. 8)
 Rick Cortes – bass guitar (tr. 8)
 Marty Grebb – horn arrangements, organ (tr. 2), piano (tr. 4), sax (baritone (tr. 9), tenor (solo tr. 6)), backing vocals
 David Grissom – rhythm guitar (tr. 8)
 Richie Hayward – drums
 Darrell Leonard – trumpet
 Ian McLagan – Wurlitzer electric piano (tr. 1, 3, 11)
 Bill Payne – piano (tr. 2, 3, 5, 6, 7, 9, 10) 
 John Porter – guitar (tr. 1, 2, 5, 6, 7, 10)
 Jimmy Powers – harp (tr. 4)
 Greg Rzab – bass
 Johnny Lee Schell – guitar (tr. 1, 3, 4, 6, 9, 10, 11)
 John Philip Shenale – organ, synthesizer (tr. 10)
 Joe Sublett – tenor saxophone
 Mick Weaver – organ (tr. 5, 7)
 Joe Yuele – drums (tr. 8)
 Mike Finnigan (misspelled as Mike Finnegan), Renée Geyer – backing vocals

Production

 John Porter – producer (tracks 1–7 and 9–11)
 Dave McNair – engineer, producer (track 8)
 R. S. Field – producer (track 8)
 Ron Kaplan – executive producer
 John Mayall – assistant producer
 Tony Platt – engineer
 Stephen Marcussen – mastering

References

1993 albums
Buddy Guy albums
Grammy Award for Best Contemporary Blues Album
Albums produced by John Porter (musician)